The Penitent Saint Peter is a painting by El Greco. It is part of the collection of the San Diego Museum of Art and depicts a praying Saint Peter, one of Jesus' apostles.

References

External links
 
 , San Diego Museum of Art

Angels in art
Paintings by El Greco
Paintings depicting Saint Peter
Paintings in the collection of the San Diego Museum of Art